Mudzhukh-Kazma is a village in the Qusar Rayon of Azerbaijan.

References 

Populated places in Qusar District